Qaleh Kuchek or Qaleh-ye Kuchek may refer to:
 Qaleh Kuchek, Semnan
 Qaleh Kuchek, West Azerbaijan